Douglas Walker may refer to:

People
 Doug Walker (curler), American curler
 Doug Walker (musician), English, Manchester-based singer-songwriter
 Doug Walker (comedian), showrunner and star of the American review comedy web series Nostalgia Critic
 Douglas Walker (artist) (born 1958), Canadian painter
 Douglas Walker (sprinter) (born 1973), former Scottish sprinter
 Peahead Walker (Douglas Clyde Walker; 1899–1970), American football and baseball player
 Douglas K. Walker (born 1955), American astronomer and engineer after whom asteroid 128795 Douglaswalker is named
 Doug Walker (Kansas politician) (born 1952), Kansas state senator

Characters
 Doug Walker, fictional character from the 2010 British horror film 13Hrs
 Douglas Walker, fictional character from the 1945 American zombie comedy film Zombies on Broadway